Mystery Hunters India is an Indian documentary television series aimed at a young audience. This investigative show aired on Discovery Kids (Asia). This series was developed by Myleene Aga Williams and Canadian production house.

Teenage hosts Apoorva and Himanshu investigate Indian mysteries.

Characters

Doubting Dev
Doubting Dev, played by actor and stand-up comedian Mantra is the "residential sceptical scientist" in this show.

Apoorva and Himanshu
Apoorva Arora (born 1996) and Himanshu Sharma (born 1998) are the ones who go to a wide variety of locations all over India to investigate mysteries. They solved 24 mysteries. Apoorva helped in solving mystery of Talakad.

See also 
 Mystery Hunters

References 

2012 Indian television series debuts
Paranormal television
Indian children's television series
Indian mystery television series
Discovery Kids (Indian TV channel) original programming
Indian television series based on non-Indian television series